The Grand Inna Malioboro is a historic colonial hotel in Yogyakarta, Indonesia. Established in 1908 as the Grand Hotel de Djokja, then when the Japanese Empire came to Yogyakarta, the hotel name was changed to Hotel Asahi, it was later known as the Hotel Merdeka, Natour Hotel Garuda, and Inna Garuda. It contains 223 rooms. The hotel was once effectively the de facto headquarters for the government and a Christian stronghold. The hotel is a part of Hotel Indonesia Group chain, a subsidiary of state-owned tourism holding company InJourney.

References

Hotels in Indonesia
Hotels established in 1908
Hotel buildings completed in 1908
Buildings and structures in Yogyakarta
1908 establishments in the Dutch East Indies
InJourney